The 1981–82 Quebec Nordiques season was the Nordiques' third season in the National Hockey League.  The Nordiques had a successful regular season, qualifying for the playoffs, but they had a better playoff, making it to the Wales Final before losing to the eventual Stanley Cup champion New York Islanders.

Off-season
During the off-season, the four divisions of the NHL were re-aligned to better reflect the geographical locations of the teams.  Quebec remained in the Adams Division with the Boston Bruins and Buffalo Sabres, while the Minnesota North Stars and Toronto Maple Leafs were replaced with the Hartford Whalers and the Nordiques' provincial rival, the Montreal Canadiens. The Nordiques signed Marian Stastny out of Czechoslovakia, the brother of Peter Stastny and Anton Stastny. Quebec replaced team captain Marc Tardif with Robbie Ftorek prior to the season. Ftorek did not remain the Nordiques captain for long, as he was traded to the New York Rangers in December, and was replaced with Andre Dupont.

Regular season
The Nordiques found themselves under .500 only once throughout the season, and that was five games in when they had a record of 2-3-0. Quebec got hot, and eventually reached a season-high nine games over .500 in the middle of January, however, a late season slump had the Nords finish the year only two games above .500, with a 33-31-16 record, earning 82 points, which was good enough to finish fourth in the Adams Division, and the Nordiques second post-season appearance in a row.

Offensively, the Nordiques were led by Peter Stastny, who set a team record with 139 points, as he scored 46 goals and earned 93 assists. Stastny finished behind only Wayne Gretzky of the Edmonton Oilers and Mike Bossy of the New York Islanders in the NHL scoring race. Real Cloutier rebounded from an injury plagued 1980–81 season by scoring 37 goals and 97 points, while rookie Marian Stastny scored 35 goals and 89 points. Michel Goulet notched 42 goals and 84 points, while Dale Hunter had a breakout season, scoring 22 goals and 72 points, as well as a team record 272 penalty minutes. On defense, Mario Marois led the way, scoring 11 goals and 43 points.

In goal, Dan Bouchard held on to the number one job, winning a team record 27 games, while posting a team best 3.86 GAA, as well as earning a shutout in 60 games.

Season standings

Schedule and results

Playoffs
The Nordiques opened the 1982 Stanley Cup playoffs with a best of five Adams Division semi-final series with their Battle of Quebec rivals, the Montreal Canadiens.  Montreal finished the season on top of the Adams Division with a 46-17-17 record, earning 109 points, which was 27 more than the Nordiques.

The series opened with two games at the Montreal Forum, and the Canadiens handled the Nordiques easily in the first game, as Mario Tremblay and Mark Napier each scored twice for Montreal, leading them to a 5-1 victory.  The Nordiques fought back in the second game, as goaltender Dan Bouchard made 33 saves as Quebec defeated Montreal 3-2 to even the series up.  The series shifted to Le Colisée for the next two games, and in the third game of the series, the Nordiques were led by Dale Hunter and his two goals late in the first period, as well as another spectacular goaltending performance by Dan Bouchard, who made 22 saves, as the Nordiques edged the Canadiens 2-1 to take the series lead.  Montreal fought back in the fourth game, which featured a brawl in which every player from both teams was involved. The brawl lasted for twenty minutes. There were 149 penalty minutes, and two game misconducts. The Canadiens easily defeated the underdog Nordiques 6-2 to even the series up at two games each, with the fifth and deciding game back at the Montreal Forum. In the fifth game, the Nordiques took an early 2-0 lead with first period goals by Wilf Paiement and Anton Stastny, however, the Canadiens tied the game in the third period, setting up overtime.  In the extra period, Dale Hunter emerged as the hero, scoring 22 seconds into the period against Montreal goalie Rick Wamsley to clinch the series for the Nordiques, who then moved on to the Adams Division finals.

Quebec would face the Boston Bruins in the best of seven Adams Division finals.  Boston had a 43-27-10 record, earning 96 points, and a second-place finish in the division.  The Bruins defeated the Buffalo Sabres in four games in their first playoff round.  The series opened with two games at the Boston Garden.  In the first game, the Nordiques and Bruins were tied up at three heading into the final minute of the third period, however, Ray Bourque scored for Boston, as the Bruins won the game 4-3.  In the second game, the Bruins easily defeated Quebec by a score of 8-4, taking a commanding 2-0 series lead.  The series moved to Le Colisée for the next two games, and the Nordiques responded on their home ice, as Wilf Paiement scored the overtime winner in the third game for a 3-2 Quebec victory, cutting the Bruins series lead to 2-1.  In the fourth game, the Nordiques, led by Michel Goulet and his two goals, as well as 33 saves by goaltender John Garrett, easily defeated the Bruins 7-2 to even up the series.  The fifth game was back in Boston, however, the Nordiques, led by Peter Stastny and his two goals, shocked the Bruins with a 4-3 win to push Boston on the brink of elimination.  In the sixth game back in Quebec City, the Bruins stormed out to an early 3-0 lead, however, the Nordiques fought back, and tied the game at five in the third period, setting up overtime.  In overtime, the Bruins Peter McNab scored, as the Bruins tied the series, setting up a seventh and deciding game back in Boston.  After a scoreless first period, the Nordiques Michel Goulet opened the scoring in the second period, however, Peter McNab of the Bruins tied the game.  In the third period, Nordiques defenseman Dave Pichette scored on the powerplay, giving Quebec a 2-1 lead.  The Bruins couldn't beat Nordiques goaltender Dan Bouchard, who made 28 saves in the game, as the Nordiques held on for the 2-1 win, and completing the series upset, advancing to the Wales Conference finals.

The Nordiques opponent in the Wales Conference finals was the two time defending Stanley Cup champions, the New York Islanders.  The best of seven series opened with two games at Nassau Veterans Memorial Coliseum on Long Island, New York.  The powerful Islanders, led by 27 saves by goaltender Billy Smith, defeated Quebec 4-1 in the series opener.  In the second game, the Islanders were led by two goals by Mike Bossy, and another solid performance by Billy Smith, who made 35 saves, as New York defeated Quebec 5-2 to take a 2-0 series lead.  In the third game back in Quebec, the Nordiques took the Islanders to overtime, however, New York's Wayne Merrick emerged the hero, as he scored late in the first overtime, giving the Islanders a 5-4 victory, and 3-0 series lead.  New York completed the series sweep in the fourth game, as the Islanders took a 3-0 lead late into the third period.  Quebec put up a fight, scoring twice to cut the Islanders lead to 3-2, however, Duane Sutter scored an empty net goal to give the Islanders a 4-2 victory.

Quebec Nordiques 3, Montreal Canadiens 2

Quebec Nordiques 4, Boston Bruins 3

New York Islanders 4, Quebec Nordiques 0

Player statistics

Scoring leaders

Goaltending

Transactions
The Nordiques were involved in the following transactions during the 1981–82 season.

Trades

Free agents

Draft picks
Quebec's draft picks from the 1981 NHL Entry Draft which was held at the Montreal Forum in Montreal, Quebec.

References

SHRP Sports
The Internet Hockey Database
Hockey Reference
Goalies Archive

Quebec Nordiques season, 1981-82
Quebec Nordiques seasons
Que